Matteo D'Alessandro (born 18 May 1989) is an Italian professional footballer who plays for Piccardo Traversetolo ASD.

Career
Born in Sondrio, Lombardy, D'Alessandro started his career at Calcio Como. On 31 August 2006 he was signed by Genoa C.F.C. In 2009, he was signed by Reggiana in temporary deal.
In July 2010, the loan was extended to another season. On 31 January 2011, Reggiana bought him in co-ownership deal for a peppercorn of €500. On 31 August 2011 Reggina bought D'Alessandro from Reggiana for €100,000, with Genoa retained 50% registration rights. In June 2013 Genoa gave up the remain 50% registration rights to Reggina.

On 2 September 2013 D'Alessandro left for Lega Pro Seconda Divisione club Cuneo.

After the club relegated, he joined Lega Pro club Monza in June 2014. In January 2015 he joined Serie B club Pro Vercelli as a free agent. He took no.2 shirt from Andrea Marconi.

On 10 December 2015 he was signed by Pro Patria.

On 14 January 2017 D'Alessandro joined Lumezzane. In August 2019, D'Alessandro signed with Piccardo Traversetolo ASD.

References

Emanuele Perego, https://www.lavocedeltrentino.it/2018/01/14/storie-calcio-matteo-dalessandro-romantico-sogno/ 14 January 2018

External links
 
 

1989 births
Living people
Italian footballers
Genoa C.F.C. players
A.C. Reggiana 1919 players
Reggina 1914 players
Serie B players
Serie C players
Serie D players
Association football defenders
A.C. Cuneo 1905 players
A.C. Monza players
F.C. Pro Vercelli 1892 players
Aurora Pro Patria 1919 players
F.C. Lumezzane V.G.Z. A.S.D. players
Abano Calcio players
Vastese Calcio 1902 players
S.E.F. Torres 1903 players